Gifted (Chinese: 天之骄子) is a Singaporean drama produced by Mediacorp Studios Malaysia and telecast on Mediacorp Channel 8. The show is currently airing at 9pm on weekdays and has a repeat telecast at 8am the following day. The series consists of 20 episodes.

Cast

 Elvin Ng as Guan Yaozu 关耀祖
 Zhang Yaodong as Li Xiaoyi 李孝义
 Tong Bing Yu as Su Lingli 苏伶俐
 Dawn Yeoh as He Lulu 何露露
 Michelle Chia as Yao Liqian 姚丽倩
 Patrick Lee 李沛旭 as Guan Dezhi 关得志
 Federick Lee 李铭忠 as Liao Weihao 廖伟豪
 Fiona Xie as Ma Xinrou 马心柔

 Teddy Tang as Zhao Qikang 赵启康
 Hong Huifang as Hu Jinmei 胡锦梅
 Chen Xiuhuan as Luo Yali 罗雅丽
 Bernard Tan 陈传之 as Zhao Donghao 赵洞豪
 Zhang Wei 张为 as Grandpa Luo 罗爷爷
 Jeffrey Chong 庄惟翔 as Ma Dongliang 马栋梁

Original Sound Tracks

See also
 List of programmes broadcast by Mediacorp Channel 8

References 

Mediacorp Chinese language programmes